Xavier Collin (born 17 August 1974) is a French football coach and former professional footballer. During an 18-year playing career, he played as a defender for Épinal, Poitiers, Amiens, Gueugnon, Ajaccio and Montpellier.

In June 2011, Collin was appointed manager of Championnat de France amateur Group A side AS Béziers. He left AS Béziers in 2015. He was later appointed as Épinal manager. After five years managing the club, he left at the end of his contract in May 2021 to take the head coach position at Orléans.

Honours
Gueugnon
 Coupe de la Ligue: 1999–2000

References

External links

Living people
1974 births
Association football defenders
French footballers
SAS Épinal players
Stade Poitevin FC players
Amiens SC players
FC Gueugnon players
AC Ajaccio players
Montpellier HSC players
Ligue 1 players
Ligue 2 players
French football managers
AS Béziers (2007) managers
US Orléans managers
SAS Épinal managers